South Wingfield is a civil parish in the Amber Valley district of Derbyshire, England.  The parish contains 40 listed buildings that are recorded in the National Heritage List for England. Of these, one is listed at Grade I, the highest of the three grades, two are at Grade II*, the middle grade, and the others are at Grade II, the lowest grade.  The parish contains the villages of South Wingfield and Oakerthorpe and the surrounding countryside.  A railway built by the North Midland Railway runs through the parish, and the listed buildings associated with it are bridges, tunnel portals, and a station and associated structures.  The other listed buildings include a ruined manor house, smaller houses, cottages and associated structures, farmhouses and farm buildings, a church, road bridges, public houses, and a former windmill.


Key

Buildings

References

Citations

Sources

 

Lists of listed buildings in Derbyshire